Kawakami Dam  is a gravity dam located in Mie Prefecture in Japan. The dam is used for flood control and water supply. The catchment area of the dam is 54.7 km2. The dam impounds about 104  ha of land when full and can store 31000 thousand cubic meters of water. The construction of the dam was started on 1981.

See also
List of dams in Japan

References

Dams in Mie Prefecture